The National Institute of Amateur Radio is an amateur radio club based in Hyderabad, Telangana in India.

References

External links
Official site

Amateur radio organisations in India